The Satellite was a line of laptops manufactured by Toshiba's computer subsidiary now known as Dynabook Inc. Models in the Satellite family varied greatly—from entry-level models sold to consumers at major retailers to full-fledged business laptops sold through enterprise channels. The latter were marketed as the Satellite Pro.

The earliest models in the series, introduced in the early 1990s, were one of the first to directly compete against IBM's ThinkPad line. The consumer Satellite series later competed against Acer's Aspire, Dell's Inspiron and XPS laptops, HP's Pavilion, and Lenovo's IdeaPad.

Toshiba discontinued the Satellite in 2016 after they left the computer market that year. In 2019, Sharp Corporation bought majority interest of Toshiba's computer subsidiary, later buying the remainder of Toshiba's shares in 2020, and renamed the company to Dynabook Inc. That year, Dynabook resurrected the Satellite Pro series, positioning it between their consumer E series and their business Tecra (the latter also formerly manufactured by Toshiba).

History 
The early models did not come with an internal CD-ROM drive, but these soon appeared as mobile technology progressed. Such models can link up with an external CD-ROM drive through the parallel port on the rear (since USB ports came later as well). Some Satellites also lacked an internal floppy disk drive, but a port on the side allowed the use of a proprietary external module for such. These machines tended to be smaller in physical size than their contemporaries.

A Toshiba Satellite personal computer was used to send the first email ever sent by President Bill Clinton during his presidency. The email was sent using the personal computer of White House Medical Unit Emergency Physician Dr. Robert G. Darling, and was sent to astronaut John Glenn as he was aboard the Space Shuttle Discovery.

Notable models included the Satellite 5005-S507 which was the first to ship with NVIDIA GeForce 4 440 Go GPU and cost . The Satellite 5105-S607 was the first laptop with cPad technology and cost . The Satellite 5205-S703 was the first laptop with built-in DVD-R/RW drive and cost .

Sharp Corporation obtained 80.1% of Toshiba's computer subsidiary in October 2018. In April 2019, Sharp renamed the subsidiary Dynabook Inc. In 2020, Toshiba sold their remaining shares to Sharp. Sharp resurrected the Satellite Pro series that year.

Satellite models

Numeric 
The Satellite line was introduced in 1992 with the T1800 and T1850 models, the T1800C and T1850C variants of which were one of the first notebooks with passive-matrix color LCDs. Succeeding entries in the line followed this naming scheme, such as the Satellite T1900, T2110CS and T2130CS. Beginning with the barebones 100CS and 100CT in February 1996, Toshiba began using only numbers to name their Satellites, a convention which continued until 2003 with the introduction of the Satellite A series.

Lettered 
Toshiba began using letter prefixes to differentiate its concurrent series of Satellite laptops. These included the A series; the C series; the E series; the L series; the M series; the P series; the R series; the S series; the T series; the U series; and the W series. CNET wrote in 2011 that "Toshiba may not run out of new product lines until it runs out of letters".

A series

The A series was Toshiba's first premium consumer line of Satellite laptops. Introduced with the A10 and A20 models in 2003, the A series originally targeted high school and college students and workers of small offices and home offices, before becoming a premium line by the late 2000s. The A series was succeeded by the P series in 2011.

C series

The C series was Toshiba's budget consumer line of Satellite laptops. Screen sizes on the C series ranged between 14 and 17 in diagonally; the laptops were offered with Intel or AMD processors.

E series
The 2010s-issue E-series Satellites were Best Buy-exclusive midrange consumer models.

L series

The L series Satellites were Toshiba's mainstream consumer line of Satellite laptops. The first models of the L series came out in 2005. The 2010s-issue L series was priced just above of the C series and included similar features but featured improved keyboards, trackpads, and speakers, USB 3.0 ports, and Core i7 processor configurations. Toshiba targeted the L series at students.

M series, U series
The M and U series Satellites were marketed as multimedia-oriented machines, powerful enough for casual gaming and video playback while still being lightweight enough to be easily mobile. Toshiba marketed the U series as the more stylish of the two.

P series

The P series was Toshiba's second premium consumer line of Satellite laptops. Introduced in 2003, it later eclipsed the premium A series. The first entry in the series, the P25, was one of the first laptops to feature a widescreen 17-in LCD; it was also one of the first laptops to feature an internal DVD±RW drive. P series models introduced in 2012 were priced at US$800, $100 higher than their midrange S series counterparts.

R series
The R series was a convertible laptop in the Satellite line released from 2005 to 2006. It comprised the R10, R15, R20, and R25; all featured a swivel-hinge display that the user could rotate 180 degrees to cover the keyboard and use the laptops with a stylus. A non-convertible midrange entry, the R845, was released in 2011.

S series

The S series was Toshiba's midrange line of Satellite laptops introduced in 2012. It was positioned above their mainstream L series but below the premium P range. Features included Nvidia GeForce graphics processing units, Harman Kardon speakers, optional touchscreen displays and optional backlit keyboards; it was the lowest price entry of the Satellite family to offer discrete graphics. Displays ranged from 14 to 17.3 inches diagonally in size.

T series
The T series was Toshiba's line of Satellite ultrabooks.

Satellite Click, Satellite Radius
The Satellite Click and Satellite Radius were convertible laptops introduced in 2013 and 2014 respectively. The Satellite Radius had a folding hinge, while the Satellite Click's display was entirely detachable.

References

External links

  (Archive) of Toshiba Satellite
 Official website (in Japan) of Toshiba Satellite (dynabook.com)
  (Archive) of Toshiba Satellite Pro

Consumer electronics brands
Discontinued products
Satellite
Ultrabooks